Aaron Campbell (born September 17, 1991) is an American voice actor, most known for his voice work in English dubs of Japanese anime, particularly those associated with Crunchyroll. Notable roles include Madoka from Chainsaw Man, Perospero and Napoleon from One Piece,  Red from Banished from the Hero's Party, I Decided to Live a Quiet Life in the Countryside, Majestic and Kotaro Shimura from My Hero Academia, Gauma from SSSS.Dynazenon, Aizo Shibasaki from Heroines Run the Show, Makoto Shibe from Tomodachi Game, Kuroto Nakano from The Helpful Fox Senko-san, Itsuki Aoyama from Stand My Heroes, Taichi Narata from Kageki Shojo!! and Morisawa Chiaki from Ensemble Stars!.

Career
Following his graduation from Drury University with a degree in Theatre and Multimedia Production and Journalism, Campbell served as a news anchor and reporter at FOX 5 KRBK from 2014 to 2017. Campbell later obtained his M.F.A in Acting at Southern Methodist University in 2020 and began focusing on acting and voice work. Originally starting his voice over career with Funimation until the company's transition to the Crunchyroll brand, he's been in more than one hundred and fifty titles since 2017.

Filmography

Anime

Film and Commercial Work

References

External links 
 
 
 
 

1991 births
Living people
American male video game actors
American male voice actors
Male actors from Missouri
People from Springfield, Missouri
Southern Methodist University alumni